Lilly Krug (born 5 June 2001 in Munich) is a German film and television actress and social media personality.

Early life and family
Lilly Krug was born in Munich, Germany to actress Veronica Ferres and marketing manager Martin Krug. After her parents had divorced and her mother remarried, the entrepreneur Carsten Maschmeyer became her stepfather.

Career and education
In 2019, Krug graduated from the Bavarian International School in Munich with the International Baccalaureate.
She is currently studying psychology and acting at the University of Southern California.

Krug, who currently resides in Los Angeles, followed her mother's footsteps and began working as an actress. She has been featured in movies alongside Michael Shannon, Casey Affleck and Gael García Bernal.

Lilly has also mentioned that her idol and primary influence is actress Margot Robbie.

Filmography

References

External links 
 

2001 births
Living people
Actresses from Munich
German film actresses
21st-century German actresses